Religious Wars is the third EP by the anarcho-punk band Subhumans. It was released on Spiderleg Records in 1982, and rereleased as part of the EP-LP compilation on Bluurg Records in 1985.

Track listing
 "Religious Wars"
 "Love Is..."
 "It's Gonna Get Worse"
 "Work Experience"

Personnel
Dick Lucas - vocals
Bruce - guitar
Grant - bass
Trotsky - drums
Steve C. - engineer

1982 EPs
Subhumans (British band) albums